Artur Kartashyan (born 8 January 1997) is an Armenian footballer who played as a defender for Olympiakos Nicosia.

International career
Kartashyan made his international debut for Armenia on 16 November 2018, starting in the 2018–19 UEFA Nations League D match against Gibraltar. He assisted Yura Movsisyan on the first of his 4 goals, and then scored himself in the 66th minute to put Armenia up 5–1, with the match finishing as a 6–2 away win.

Career statistics

International

International goals

References

External links
 
 

1997 births
Living people
Footballers from Yerevan
Armenian footballers
Armenia youth international footballers
Armenia under-21 international footballers
Armenia international footballers
Association football defenders
FC Pyunik players
Armenian Premier League players
Olympiakos Nicosia players